Soul train may refer to:

 Soul Train (1971–2006), an African-American music and dance television show
 "Soul Train", a song by YBN Nahmir from his 2021 album Visionland
 Soul Train Music Awards, annual music awards for African-American music, spun off from the American TV show
 The Soul Train Gang, the dance troupe established by the American TV show
 Soul Train Records, a U.S. record label for African-American music
 Soul Train Radio, a UK radio station for soul music
 Soul Train Jones, pro wrestler

See also

 Soultrane, a 1958 jazz album by John Coltrane
 Soultrane, a 1957 jazz tune by Tadd Dameron from the album Mating Call
 
 
 Train (disambiguation)
 Soul (disambiguation)